Xi Murong (born 1943) is a writer and painter.  She is most famous for her poetry, especially the collections Qi li xiang (Seven-li scent) and Wuyuan de qingchun (Unregrettable Youth).

Personal life 
On 15 October 1943, Xi was born in Sichuan, China.

In 1949, Xi moved to Hong Kong with her family.

In 1953, Xi moved to Taiwan.

In 1959, Xi entered the National Taiwan Normal University, and majored in Fine Art.

In 1963, Xi graduated from National Taiwan Normal University, and started to teach in Taipei Renai Middle School.

In 1964, Xi entered the Academie Royale des Beaux-Arts, in Belgium, and majored in Senior Oil-Painting.

In February 1966, Xi held her first art exhibition in Beijing.

In 1974, Xi held her first art exhibition in Taiwan.

In 1976, Xi participated in Union Noval Price and get reward.

Writing
Year 1979       Drawing Portray

Year 1981       Qi Li Xiang

Year 1982       Baby In Store

Year 1983       Regardless Youth

Year 1987       Nine Works of Time

Year 1988       In the far away Place

Year 1992       Song of River

Year 1997       Prairie of Time

Year 2011       Name as Poetry

See also 
 Taiwanese art

References

External links 

 Poetry works
 A Blossoming tree  The English translation of one of her most famous poems.

1943 births
Taiwanese poets
20th-century Taiwanese poets
21st-century Taiwanese poets
Taiwanese painters
Living people
Poets from Chongqing
Taiwanese women writers
Painters from Chongqing
Taiwanese people of Mongolian descent
Taiwanese people from Chongqing
21st-century Taiwanese women writers
20th-century Taiwanese women writers
Academic staff of Tunghai University